Crocker Township is a township in Polk County, Iowa, United States.

History
Crocker Township was organized in 1871. It is named for Gen. Marcellus M. Crocker.

References

Townships in Polk County, Iowa
Townships in Iowa
1871 establishments in Iowa
Populated places established in 1871